Mattheus Lestevenon, heer van Berckenrode (1715–1797, The Hague) was a city-secretary and schepen in Amsterdam, then Dutch ambassador to France.  Lestevenon played an important role in the year 1748 and in the negotiations for the Treaty of Paris.  Pietro Locatelli dedicated six violin sonatas to him.

Life

Family 
Lestevenon was born into a powerful regent family.  His father 	Mattheus Lestevenon	(1674-1743) was an administrator of the Dutch East India Company, heer of Strijen and five-times mayor of Amsterdam (between 1722 and 1736). Gerrit de Graeff (I.) van Zuid-Polsbroek, vrijheer van Zuid-Polsbroek, was his brother in Law. In 1743 Lestevenon had married Maria Wilhelmina, baroness van der Duyn. His two children Maria Jacqueline and Willem Anne Lestevenon were born in 1749 in Brussels  and Paris respectively. On 8 June 1755 he divorced the baroness, probably while she conceived a child from an officer by the name M. De Villegagnon. Lestevenon next married Susanna Faulquier in an unknown year. He sold his house on Keizersgracht to Thomas Hope. It's the building at Singel 292, that he had inherited from his grandfather Dirk Trip, he sold to Joachim Rendorp. After an inheritance from a late aunt, Lestevenon bought a palace at Lange Voorhout on the Hague, with 16 servants.  Mattheus Lestevenon married Lady Catharina Windsor, a sister of Herbert Windsor, 2nd Viscount Windsor, in London in 1742 and went on honeymoon to Italy. His wife died of smallpox on the return trip. She was buried in Bockenheim on 26 May. Mattheus again inherited "considerable wealth and goods" ("considerabel veel gelt en goet") on the death of his father in 1743. He moved to the attractive building at Keizersgracht 444–446. Because he was not appointed as a successor to his father, it is supposed he was frustrated.

Career 
In 1729, he got a job as city secretary.  In all probability, someone else did the work and Lestevenon's earnings funded his Studie. Lestevenon was appointed schepen of Amsterdam in 1745. 

After the Pachtersoproer (1748), the Doelisten invited prince William IV and requested to remove the inter-related regenten clique and to change the appointment of mayors.  Of the forty mayors chosen between 1696–1748, only two (or, as some maintain, even just one) were not related to earlier mayors.  Finally Lestevenon left the council of his own accord.  The stadholder changed his opinion and more than half the men on the council got their seats back.  Not long after that Mattheus Lestevenon was appointed ambassador to the court to Versailles.

Little is known about his activities as ambassador.  Mostly it involved meetings with La Vauguyon on finishing the Fourth Anglo-Dutch War (1780–1784) and the Treaty of Fontainebleau (1785); his correspondence with Comte de Montmorin ends in 1788?  Mattheus Lestevenon died in 1797 in the Hague.  His son meanwhile played an important role as a Patriot.

References

Bibliography
 Elias, J. E. (1903–1905, reprinted 1963) De vroedschap van Amsterdam 1578-1795, 2 vols.
 Het dagboek van J. Bicker Raye; bewerkt door F. M. Bijerinck & M. G. de Boer, (1935).
 Ligtelijn, M. (2006) "Regentencoterieën 1650–1750". In: De Gouden Bocht van Amsterdam, p. 187. Edited and composed by Milko den Leeuw en Martin Pruijs.

External links
 Parlement & Politiek site, on Willem Anne and his father Mattheus Lestevenon

1715 births
1797 deaths
Ambassadors of the Netherlands to France
Diplomats from Amsterdam
18th-century Dutch politicians